Mohamed Rayhi (born 1 July 1994) is a Dutch professional footballer who plays as a winger for Al Dhafra in the UAE Pro League.

Career
Rayhi was included in the youth academy of PSV Eindhoven in 2003, after having scouted him at WVVZ. As an under-17 player he was sent on loan to Helmond Sport for the 2009–10 season.

Rayhi made his professional debut as a Jong PSV player in the second division on 3 August 2013 against Sparta Rotterdam, where he also scored his first goals.

On 1 October 2020, Rayhi joined Saudi Professional League club Al-Batin.

On 18 July 2022, Rayhi joined Emirati side Al-Dhafra on a free transfer.

References

External links
 
 Netherlands profile at OnsOranje

1994 births
Living people
Dutch footballers
Dutch expatriate footballers
Netherlands youth international footballers
Netherlands under-21 international footballers
PSV Eindhoven players
Jong PSV players
NEC Nijmegen players
Sparta Rotterdam players
Al Batin FC players
Al Dhafra FC players
Eredivisie players
Eerste Divisie players
Saudi Professional League players
UAE Pro League players
Footballers from Eindhoven
Dutch sportspeople of Moroccan descent
Dutch people of Riffian descent
Association football midfielders
Dutch expatriate sportspeople in Saudi Arabia
Expatriate footballers in Saudi Arabia
Dutch expatriate sportspeople in the United Arab Emirates
Expatriate footballers in the United Arab Emirates